Farrington Boult (12 June 1852 – 21 May 1882) was an English cricketer. He played 25 first-class matches for Surrey between 1872 and 1873. He was one of the amateurs who toured Australia with W. G. Grace's team in 1873-74.

See also
 List of Surrey County Cricket Club players

References

External links
 

1852 births
1882 deaths
English cricketers
Surrey cricketers
Sportspeople from Bath, Somerset
Surrey Club cricketers
Marylebone Cricket Club cricketers
North v South cricketers